Buddy Rogers (born Herman Gustav Rohde Jr.; February 20, 1921 – June 26, 1992), better known by the ring name "Nature Boy" Buddy Rogers, was an American professional wrestler who was one of the biggest professional wrestling stars in the beginning of the television era. His performances influenced future professional wrestlers, including "Nature Boy" Ric Flair, who used Rogers's nickname, as well as his look, attitude and finishing hold, the figure-four leglock. He was also known for his rivalry with Lou Thesz, both in and out of the ring.

Rogers was a fourteen-time world champion, notably holding the top championship in both the NWA and the WWF, today known as WWE (he was the inaugural WWF World Heavyweight Champion). He is one of three men in history to have held both championships, along with Ric Flair and AJ Styles.

Early life 
Rogers was the son of Herman Gustav Rohde Sr., and Frieda Stech, both German immigrants. He was athletic, and took up wrestling at age nine at the local YMCA, joining the Camden YMCA Wrestling League and winning its heavyweight championship. He served in the U.S. Navy during World War II. Rogers also excelled in football, boxing, track and swimming, winning the YMCA's three-mile swimming championship in 1937. Rogers joined the Dale Brothers Circus as a wrestler at age 17. He later worked at a shipyard, and became a police officer.

Professional wrestling career

Early career and National Wrestling Alliance (1939–1963) 
Rogers visited the offices of professional wrestling promoters Ray and Frank Hanley, who gave him his first match on July 4, 1939 against Moe Brazen, which he won. Rogers soon became a top professional wrestler using his real name around his hometown as Dutch Rhode, where he gained his first major win over Ed "Strangler" Lewis. He continued his career in Houston, where he assumed the name Buddy Rogers. Rogers would get his first title during his tenure there, winning the NWA Texas Heavyweight Championship four times, once from Lou Thesz, beginning a long feud between them both in and out of the ring. After leaving the Texas territory for Columbus, Ohio, Rogers bleached his hair, and was given the moniker "Natural Guy" by promoter Jack Pfefer. The moniker later evolved to "Nature Boy". In the early 1950s, Lillian Ellison (under the moniker Slave Girl Moolah) worked as his valet. Ellison claims that the partnership ended after Rogers pushed for a sexual relationship, which Ellison refused. With the advent of television, Rogers's flashy look, great physique and bombastic personality instantly caught the ire of audiences. The first sign of Rogers's impact was his involvement in Sam Muchnick's opposition promotion in St. Louis, Missouri, a major professional wrestling market at the time. He was pitted against Lou Thesz as a draw. In the end, Muchnick's promotion was powerful enough with Rogers as its main star that the two promotions merged. Rogers continued control of the Midwest as a booker and professional wrestler, most notably in Chicago, frequently selling out the 11,000-seat arena. In the 1950s, Rogers expanded into Vincent J. McMahon's Capitol Wrestling Corporation (CWC). He also wrestled in the Al Haft promotion out of Columbus, Ohio in the 1950s and through 1963.

In 1961, the National Wrestling Alliance (NWA) voted him into an NWA World Heavyweight Championship match. On June 30, 1961, Rogers took the title from Pat O'Connor in front of 38,622 fans at Comiskey Park, which set a new North American professional wrestling attendance record that stood until the David Von Erich Memorial Parade of Champions in 1984. In addition, the $148,000 gate in ticket sales was a professional wrestling record for almost twenty years. The contest, which was a two out of three falls match, was billed as the "Match of the Century", during which both men had gained a pinfall. However, when O'Connor missed a dropkick and hit his head, Rogers pinned him to win the match and being recognized as the new NWA World Heavyweight Champion. A rematch was set between the two for the title months later, where Rogers retained. At the time, Rogers was working at two different jobs in Chicago, but he never walked into work again according to his autobiography. Many promoters felt that Rogers favored northeastern promoters over other territories. Promoters and noted shooters Bill Miller and Karl Gotch confronted Rogers in Columbus and broke his hand. Rogers sustained another injury in Montreal against Killer Kowalski, which kept Rogers on the sidelines. Upon his return, the NWA voted to switch the title back over to Lou Thesz, who publicly disliked Rogers. On January 24, 1963, the match took place in Toronto. Rogers was hesitant about dropping the title, so promoter Sam Muchnick put three safeguards in place to guarantee Rogers's cooperation. The first safeguard was formatting the match as a one fall finish, rather than the traditional best two out of three falls. The second safeguard was his threat to give Rogers's bond away to charity, rather than returning the deposit to the dethroned Rogers. Every NWA World Heavyweight Champion was required to pay a $25,000 deposit to the NWA Board of Directors, before winning the championship belt. The deposit was held by the NWA for the duration of the champion's reign. The third safeguard was Thesz, who could "take" the title if necessary. Ultimately, Thesz won the match and the title.

Rogers was a co-holder of the NWA United States Tag Team Championship with tag team partner "Handsome" Johnny Barend. They won the championship on July 5, 1962 from Johnny Valentine and “Cowboy” Bob Ellis on Capitol Wrestling's regular Thursday night Washington, D.C. television show. Arnold Skaaland was a last minute replacement for Ellis whose flight was delayed and unable to get to the arena. With the championship on the line, Rogers and Barend isolated Skaaland whom Rogers forced to submit with his figure-four leglock to win the first fall. After Skaaland was carried from the ring on a stretcher, Valentine continued to fight alone in the second fall. Valentine fought valiantly, but was worn down by Rogers and Barend. Just when it looked like Valentine was going to succumb to the vicious attack of the heels the crowd erupted. The television cameras swung from a view of the ring to "Cowboy" Bob Ellis running down the aisle in street clothes and carrying a travel suitcase. Ellis jumped into the ring, applied multiple bulldog headlocks and pinned Barend to win the second fall for his team. The third fall featured everyone fighting inside and outside the ring. Finally, Ellis and Barend collided in the corner and knocked each other out. The referee was distracted by Valentine trying to get into the ring as Rogers grabbed an unconscious Barend by his hair and back of his trunks and threw him on top of Ellis for the victory. Rogers and Barend defeated Valentine and Ellis in a title rematch at Madison Square Garden on July 13, 1962. They defended the championship until March 7, 1963 when they lost to Killer Buddy Austin and The Great Scott on Capitol Wrestling's regular Thursday night television broadcast. Rogers and Barend split briefly and feuded, but they reunited that summer to defeat Bobo Brazil and Bruno Sammartino in a best two out of three falls tag team match. During the Rogers-Barend feud, Rogers regularly teamed with a masked wrestler, The Shadow. Prior to his title reign with Barend, Rogers frequently teamed with the "Big O" Bob Orton. During the 1950s, Rogers's main tag team partner was The Great Scott.

World Wide Wrestling Federation and semi-retirement (1963–1969) 
After Thesz defeated Rogers for the NWA World Heavyweight Championship, Northeast promoters Toots Mondt and Vincent J. McMahon withdrew their membership from the NWA and formed the World Wide Wrestling Federation (WWWF, now WWE). The promoters felt that Thesz was not a strong draw in their territory, therefore the WWWF billed Rogers as their world champion as did Fred Kohler's Chicago promotion from January 25. Rogers was formally recognized as the first ever WWWF World Heavyweight Champion on April 11, 1963 when promoter and first WWWF President Willie Gilzenberg handed Rogers the WWWF World Heavyweight Championship belt on Washington D.C. television. Gilzenberg explained that Rogers won a wrestling tournament in Rio De Janeiro, Brazil, although it was fictional. WWE.com currently cites April 25, 1963 as the beginning of Rogers's reign. Rogers was a top draw, but his reign was ultimately cut short by a mild heart attack which greatly hindered his endurance and in-ring performance. Vincent J. McMahon and Toots Mondt were in a panic and hid Rogers's medical problems. In an emergency title switch, Rogers put over Bruno Sammartino in a quick 48 second match on May 17, 1963 in Madison Square Garden. The match had to be kept short for fear of Rogers having a major heart attack and dying in the ring.

After putting over Sammartino, his health problems forced Rogers to wrestle in only a limited number of short singles matches that lasted a minute or two. He participated in a few tag team matches with partner Handsome Johnny Barend where he spent almost the entire match in his corner on the ring apron while Barend did the wrestling. Rogers defeated Hans "The Great" Mortier in less than a minute with the figure-four leglock in Madison Square Garden and teamed with Handsome Johnny Barend to take two out of three falls via pin from Sammartino and Bobo Brazil, with Rogers pinning Sammartino for the final fall. The big rematch was to be held October 4, 1963 at Roosevelt Stadium in Jersey City, New Jersey. The tickets were printed with Rogers–Sammartino on them. However, it was announced that Rogers was retiring and Gorilla Monsoon, who had won a tournament, got the title shot that night. In 1966–1967, Rogers wrestled in 18 short matches in Canada. In 1969, Rogers appeared in 19 quick matches in an Ohio-based promotion called Wrestling Show Classics before he realized his health was not getting better to the point where he could wrestle. He spent time on television talking with his former manager Bobby Davis.  A decade later, Rogers would try to make a legitimate comeback.

Jim Crockett Promotions and return to WWF (1978–1992) 
In 1979, Rogers returned to wrestling as a fan favorite in Florida, although he was in his late 50s. He later moved up to Jim Crockett Promotions (JCP) in the Carolinas as a villain manager managing professional wrestlers like Jimmy Snuka, Ken Patera, Gene Anderson, Dewey Robertson and Big John Studd. His most notable moment during his run in the Carolinas was his feud with the new "Nature Boy" Ric Flair, before Rogers put over Flair on July 9, 1978. After his time in Mid-Atlantic Championship Wrestling (MACW), he moved back into WWF where he was a fan favorite manager and part-time professional wrestler who also hosted the interview segment "Rogers' Corner" until 1983. Rogers was instrumental in helping turn Jimmy Snuka into a fan favorite, leading to Rogers managing Snuka for his feud with Lou Albano and Ray Stevens. During the feud, Rogers broke his hip and retired from professional wrestling for good. His show was replaced by "Victory Corner", which would later be replaced by "Piper's Pit". He would continue to make sporadic appearances in the WWF until 1984, right before the beginning of the Rock 'n' Wrestling era. Rogers, who was at the age of 71, was set to wrestle yet another "Nature Boy", this time Buddy Landel, in a comeback match for the Tri-State Wrestling Alliance (TWA, a predecessor of Extreme Championship Wrestling – ECW) in early 1992, but the promotion went out of business and the match never occurred.

Personal life
Rogers married Ruth "Debbie" Nixon in 1969 and subsequently adopted her son, David Buddy Rogers,  as his own. When Rogers retired from wrestling, he took a job as a manager at a Playboy Club casino. He resided in Haddonfield, New Jersey, until he moved to Fort Lauderdale, Florida, in 1987.

In 1989, while Rogers was eating a turkey sandwich at a hoagie shop in Florida, a   man in his late 20s began verbally abusing two female employees. Rogers told the man to quiet down so he could eat his sandwich in peace, but the man called him old and challenged him to a fight.  Rogers shoved the man into a wall, leading to the man throwing a chair at him. Rogers fought back and the man was vaulted five feet into a refrigerator. Rogers nailed him in the stomach and the man flew into the kitchen. He then held onto Rogers' hair repeatedly telling him to stop, fleeing the shop afterwards. Rogers, who received 14 stitches after the fight, stated to a reporter that the man calling him old was the worst part of the incident, then saying "Hell, I'm only 68, that's not so old."

Death 
In early 1992, Rogers’ health deteriorated. He had a broken arm and suffered three strokes, two of them occurring on the same day. At his own request he was not placed on life-support and died on June 26, 1992 at the age of 71. Other reports suggest that his death was as the result of a heart attack. He had previously suffered a fall at a supermarket and subsequently underwent heart-bypass surgery.

Legacy 
Lou Thesz, Rogers's long-time colleague and frequent opponent, described Rogers's early impact in his memoir, Hooker:
Rogers is remembered by fans and performers alike as one of the top all-time stars in the business, but it's probably not common knowledge just how influential he was... he broke into the business somewhere around 1941 as a hero-type personality, with little more going for him than a good body and natural charisma in the ring – which is actually a pretty good beginning – and he was a hit almost from the start. He had that indefinable something fans responded to, and he was sharp enough to build upon what he had, paying attention to what got a reaction from the fans. What evolved over several years was the "Nature Boy", the prototype of the cocky, strutting, sneering, arrogant peroxide blond villain that is almost a tired wrestling cliché today. Rogers invented the character, and I believe he did it better than anyone.
Thesz continued,
He was also one of the first guys to rely a lot on what we called "flying" moves in the ring – body slams, dropkicks, piledrivers, ricochets off the ropes into his opponent, action moves that are commonplace today. All of those moves were in use before Rogers came along, but they were used sparingly; most of the wrestling prior to Rogers's emergence was done on the mat. Rogers was the first to use flying moves in quantity, staying off the mat, and the style was so popular with the fans that other wrestlers, including me, followed his lead.
Another Rogers contribution to modern professional wrestling was his bombastic interviewing style. Professional wrestlers might talk and converse with interviewers, but Rogers bragged and boasted about how great he was and how pathetic his opponents were. After winning the NWA World Heavyweight Championship from Pat O'Connor in Chicago in 1961, Rogers accepted the title belt and then took the microphone and shouted, "To a nicer guy it couldn't happen!" This type of bombastic style went over well with the fans and has been followed ever since. However, Rogers was not well liked during his prime years because he had a habit of taking advantage of opponents in the ring. During his prime years, he was known as much for his distinctive peacock-like strut as for his wrestling performance. He was also very skilled at drawing heat during interviews, with a smug "to a nicer guy, it couldn't have happened" being his catchphrase of sorts whenever he was victorious. He may have been the first authentic "charismatic" professional wrestler, who, along with almost equally charismatic Bobby Davis, would use cruel, yet hilarious, put-downs of his opponents, such as: "After I get through with him, he'll be back driving a garbage truck where he belongs". Almost like a tag team of pseudo-arrogance, Davis would incredulously say of Roger's opponents that they did not even deserve to be in the same ring as Rogers, bemoaning the fact that "this is a sport of kings!" Although he was viewed as a villain in most areas during most of his career, Rogers was always a fan favorite in cities throughout Ohio. This was probably due to his appearances for many years with the Al Haft Promotion who had their offices in Columbus.

According to Thesz, Rogers, although admittedly an excellent professional wrestler and a superb showman, was a manipulative schemer behind the scenes and was fond of saying in private: "Screw your friends and be nice to your enemies, so your enemies will become your friends, and then you can screw them too". With age, however, Rogers mellowed and became a very respected veteran and spokesman for professional wrestling. Rogers had one of the longest consistent top drawing periods of any main eventer (15 years) and the ability to draw in several different territories successfully. In 1994, he was posthumously inducted into the World Wrestling Federation Hall of Fame class of 1994. Fellow professional wrestlers Ric Flair and Buddy Landel adopted the "Nature Boy" gimmick from Rogers as a tribute to him. Even using Rogers's own signature move, the figure-four leglock, as his own, Flair even went as far as doing his own variation of the Rogers strut as well.

Championships and accomplishments 
 American Wrestling Association
 AWA World Heavyweight Championship (Chicago version) (1 time)
 American Wrestling Association (Ohio)
 AWA World Heavyweight Championship (Ohio version) (3 times)
 American Wrestling Association (New England)
 AWA Eastern States Heavyweight Championship (1 time)
 Capitol Wrestling Corporation
 NWA United States Heavyweight Championship (Northeast version) (1 time, inaugural)
 NWA United States Tag Team Championship (Northeast version) (2 times) – with Johnny Valentine (1) and Johnny Barend (1)
International Professional Wrestling Hall of Fame
Class of 2021
 Midwest Wrestling Association MWA Ohio Tag Team Championship (7 times) – with Great Scott (6) and Juan Sebastian (1)
 Jack Pfefer Promotions World Heavyweight Championship (Jack Pfeffer version) (4 times)
 Montreal Athletic Commission World Heavyweight Championship (Montreal version) (3 times)
 National Wrestling Alliance NWA World Heavyweight Championship (1 time)
 NWA Hall of Fame (class of 2010)
 NWA Chicago NWA United States Heavyweight Championship (Chicago version) (1 time)
 NWA Mid-America NWA Mid-America Heavyweight Championship (1 time)
 NWA San Francisco NWA World Tag Team Championship (San Francisco version) (1 time) – with Ronnie Etchison
 NWA Western States Sports NWA North American Heavyweight Championship (Amarillo version) (1 time)
 Pro Wrestling Illustrated Stanley Weston Award (1990)
 Professional Wrestling Hall of Fame and Museum Class of 2002 (Television Era)
 Southwest Sports Inc. NWA Texas Heavyweight Championship (7 times)1
 NWA Texas Tag Team Championship (1 time) – with Otto Kuss
 St. Louis Wrestling Hall of Fame Class of 2008
 World Wide Wrestling AllianceWWWA World Heavyweight Championship (1 time)
 World Wide Wrestling Federation/World Wrestling Federation WWWF World Heavyweight Championship (1 time, inaugural)
 WWF Hall of Fame (Class of 1994)
 Wrestling Observer Newsletter Wrestling Observer Newsletter Hall of Fame (Class of 1996)
 Other titles Maryland Eastern Heavyweight Championship (12 times)Victory Championship Wrestling'''
VCW Hall of Fame (Class of 2018)

1 Five of Rogers's six reigns with the NWA Texas Heavyweight Championship occurred before the title came under the control of the NWA and before the NWA was created. The situation is the same regarding Rogers's reign with the NWA Texas Tag Team Championship.

References

External links 
 
 
 

1921 births
1992 deaths
20th-century American male actors
20th-century professional wrestlers
American male professional wrestlers
American people of German descent
NWA World Heavyweight Champions
Professional wrestlers from New Jersey
Professional Wrestling Hall of Fame and Museum
Sportspeople from Camden, New Jersey
WWE Hall of Fame inductees
WWE Champions
United States Navy personnel of World War II